Mikhail Mikhailovich Safonov (born 7 January 1947) is a retired Soviet diver. He competed in the 3 m springboard at the 1964 and 1968 Summer Olympics and finished in seventh and ninth place, respectively; in 1968 he also finished ninth in the 10 m platform. He won the springboard event at the 1966 European Aquatics Championships and at the Soviet championships in 1966–1968 and 1971.

He was married Tamara Safonova, a Soviet diver who also competed at the 1964 and 1968 Olympics.

References

External links
Profile at Infosport.ru 

1947 births
Living people
Divers from Moscow
Soviet male divers
Olympic divers of the Soviet Union
Divers at the 1964 Summer Olympics
Divers at the 1968 Summer Olympics
Universiade medalists in diving
Universiade bronze medalists for the Soviet Union
Medalists at the 1965 Summer Universiade
Spartak athletes